Sergio Rojas (28 September 1940 – 6 March 2010) was a Paraguayan footballer. He played in 29 matches for the Paraguay national football team from 1964 to 1971. He was also part of Paraguay's squad for the 1967 South American Championship.

References

External links
 

1940 births
2010 deaths
Paraguayan footballers
Paraguay international footballers
Place of birth missing
Association football central defenders
Club Guaraní players